Defence Electronics Research Laboratory (DLRL) is a laboratory of the Defence Research & Development Organization (DRDO). Located in Hyderabad, it is actively involved in the design and development of integrated Electronic Warfare systems for the Indian Armed Forces.

History 
DLRL was established in 1961 under DRDO, in order to meet the needs and requirements of electronic warfare systems for the Indian Armed Forces, including communication and radar systems. These functions were later handed over to specialized laboratories. Communication cipher equipment, developed by DLRL, was successfully deployed in the 1965 war with Pakistan.

It was founded by S. P. Chakravarti, the father of Electronics and Telecommunication engineering in India, who also founded LRDE and DRDL.

DLRL was included on the list of Indian entities that were subjected to US sanctions announced after the May 1998 nuclear tests.

The testing and evaluation of EW systems demand huge infrastructure, test and evaluation facilities.  To cater to this requirement, ELSEC, an extension of DLRL, was established in 1998 on a 180  acre campus. EW system simulation and modeling facilities are located inside ELSEC to carry out simulation of complex systems.

Areas of Work 
DLRL has been entrusted with the primary responsibility of design & development of state-of-the-art electronic warfare systems (COMINT/ELINT/ESM/ECM) covering radar and communication frequency bands. It also conducts systems integration and evaluation of these technologies on various platforms, like aircraft, ships, helicopters, vehicles, etc.

Additionally, DLRL also conducts specialized training courses in Electronic Warfare and technology management for DRDO Scientists and officers of the Indian Armed Forces.

Currently DLRL is involved in the Integrated Guided Missile Development Program (IGMDP), providing ground electronic support for IGMDP, and expertise in the design and development of various components, antennas and sub-systems for HF to microwave and millimetric wave frequencies.

Facilities 
DLRL has various design, manufacture and testing facilities:

 Mechanical CAD/CAE/CAM facility - For design, packaging and manufacture of  electronic systems and LRUs. Mechanical Fabrication Facility, Thermal and Structural analysis facilities are also available in this center.
 Hybrid Micro-electronics Facility - For fabrication of microwave integrated circuits for specific applications. Both thin film and thick film hybrids are also fabricated for in-house use.
 ASIC Design workstations
 Anechoic chamber and Open Test Ranges - For testing different types of antennas and Radomes covering Microwave & millimetric wave Frequencies.
 Automation Test and Measurement Laboratory -  This facility caters to the fine grain analysis and parametric evaluation of various RF components, devices, Subsystems/ Systems of EW suites covering a frequency range of 10 MHz to 40 GHz.
 EMI/EMC Test Laboratory - This lab tests Components and Sub Systems to testing in the frequency range of 30 Hz to 40 GHz for emission testing and 30 Hz to 18 GHz for susceptibility testing.
 Environmental Test Laboratory - This facility consists of environmental chambers, bump and vibrations test set ups and is used for performing environmental tests on different electronic sub-systems and systems.
 PCB Design and fabrication Facility - The facility caters to the in-house requirement of double and multi-layer PCBs. The  fabrication facility is capable of handling up to 12 layers with RF microwave CAE CAD.

Projects and Products 

In close coordination with various production agencies, other DRDO/National Laboratories and academic institutions, DLRL has designed, developed and produced a large number of ruggedised Electronic Warfare (EW) Systems. These systems have been inducted into the Services after rigorous field evaluation and user testing.

Ex - Directors 
 V. Narayana Rao
 E. Bhagiratha Rao
 K. Swamynathan
 K. Raghunathan
 K. K. Srivasthava
 N. Diwakar
 G. Kumaraswamy Rao
 Dr R Srihari Rao
 G. Boopathy
 S.P. Dash
 Dr C G Balaji

Ex - Scientists 
 G. Kanttaiah
 A. Rama Rao - First officer of DLRL
 DMSR MURTHY
 Dr. B. Lakshmi Narayana
 Dr K B Srinivasa Chary

References

External links 
 DLRL Home Page
 GlobalSecurity.org report on DLRL

DLRL
Research institutes in Hyderabad, India
1961 establishments in Andhra Pradesh
Research institutes established in 1961